Chang Sop-choe (born 18 July 1955) is a North Korean former long-distance runner. He competed in the marathon at the 1976 Summer Olympics and the 1980 Summer Olympics.

Chang won the 1975 Košice Peace Marathon with a record time. His win signified the beginning of marathon running in earnest in North Korea. He became the greatest North Korean athlete of his time, and received the title of Merited Athlete. The popular film Run, Korea! depicts his life.

Mun Gyong-ae, a female marathoner who brought marathon back to the forefront after a decline in the 1980s, has been compared to Chang.

References

Works cited
 

1955 births
Living people
Athletes (track and field) at the 1976 Summer Olympics
Athletes (track and field) at the 1980 Summer Olympics
North Korean male long-distance runners
North Korean male marathon runners
Olympic athletes of North Korea
Place of birth missing (living people)
Asian Games medalists in athletics (track and field)
Asian Games silver medalists for North Korea
Athletes (track and field) at the 1978 Asian Games
Medalists at the 1978 Asian Games
20th-century North Korean people